Iborra is a surname. Notable people with the surname include:

Monique Iborra (born 1945), French politician
José Iborra Blanco (1908–2002), Spanish footballer
Vicente Iborra (born 1988), Spanish footballer

See also
Ibarra (surname)